Trouble in Store is a 1934 British comedy film directed by Clyde Cook, produced by Irving Asher and starring James Finlayson, Jack Hobbs and Clifford Heatherley. It was made by Warner Bros. as a quota quickie at the company's Teddington Studios and includes the debut screen performance of Joan Hickson.

Premise
Comedy and action ensue when a group of store assistants, who are accidentally shut in overnight, spy a break-in and try to apprehend the thieves.

Cast
 James Finlayson as The Watchman  
 Jack Hobbs as Jack  
 Anthony Hankey as Tony
 Clifford Heatherley as Potts  
 Margaret Yarde as Landlady  
 Charles Carson as Sanderson  
 Millicent Wolf as Venese
 Joan Hickson as Mabel 
 Charles Hawtrey

References

Bibliography
 Low, Rachael. Filmmaking in 1930s Britain. George Allen & Unwin, 1985.
 Wood, Linda. British Films, 1927-1939. British Film Institute, 1986.

External links

1934 films
1934 comedy films
British black-and-white films
British comedy films
Films shot at Teddington Studios
Warner Bros. films
1930s English-language films
1930s British films